The 2012–13 season was Tottenham Hotspur's 21st season in the Premier League and 35th successive season in the top division of the English football league system.

The campaign featured Tottenham's 11th appearance in the UEFA Europa League (formerly the UEFA Cup), entering the group stage due to finishing fourth in the 2011–12 Premier League season but missing out on qualification to the Champions League due to their London rivals Chelsea winning the Champions League trophy in 2012 but finishing outside of the top four positions in the Premier League. The season was also notable for the fact that Tottenham achieved their record points tally in a Premier League season, 72 points from 38 games. They scored 66 goals and conceded 46 throughout the course of the Premier League season, ending with a goal difference of +20.

Squad

Transfers

In

First team

Total spending:   £60 million

Out

First team

Under-21

Loan out

Total income:   £66.5 million

Transfer summary

Transfers in =   £60 million

Transfers out =   £66.5 million

Net =   £6.5 million

Competitions

Overall

League table

Results summary

Results by matchday

Matches

Pre-season

Premier League

Football League Cup

FA Cup

UEFA Europa League

Group stage

Knockout phase

Round of 32

Round of 16

4 – 4 aggregate, Tottenham Hotspur win on away goals

Quarter-final

Post-season

Tottenham played against the Jamaica national football team on 23 May 2013 in The Bahamas as part of the 40th anniversary of Bahamas' independence celebrations. Jamaica used the game as part of their preparations for the 2014 World Cup qualifying campaign.

Statistics

Appearances

Goal scorers 

The list is sorted by shirt number when total goals are equal.

Clean sheets

The list is sorted by shirt number when total clean sheets are equal.

Notes

References

External links
Official Club site

Tottenham Hotspur F.C.
Tottenham Hotspur F.C. seasons
Tottenham Hotspur